Meehan Bonnar (born April 20, 1947) is a Canadian former professional ice hockey right winger.  He was drafted in the first round, 10th overall, by the Boston Bruins in the 1967 NHL Amateur Draft.  He never played in the National Hockey League, however.

Career statistics
                                            --- Regular Season ---  ---- Playoffs ----
Season   Team                        Lge    GP    G    A  Pts  PIM  GP   G   A Pts PIM
--------------------------------------------------------------------------------------
1967-68  Johnstown-Syracuse          EHL    20    4    8   12   41  --  --  --  --  --
1967-68  Dayton-Port Huron           IHL    14    4    5    9    4  --  --  --  --  --
1967-68  Oklahoma City Blazers       CPHL    3    0    0    0    0  --  --  --  --  --
1968-69  Port Huron Flags            IHL    36   14   18   32   45  --  --  --  --  --
1969-70  Des Moines Oak Leafs        IHL    41    8   13   21  105  --  --  --  --  --
1972-73  Port Huron Wings            IHL    67   22   27   49  129  11   5   3   8  26
1973-74  Virginia Wings              AHL    74   17   23   40  151  --  --  --  --  --
1974-75  Syracuse Eagles             AHL    40    7    9   16  112  --  --  --  --  --
--------------------------------------------------------------------------------------

See also
List of AHL seasons

External links

1947 births
Boston Bruins draft picks
Canadian ice hockey right wingers
Dayton Gems players
Des Moines Oak Leafs players
Eastern Hockey League players
Ice hockey people from New Brunswick
Living people
National Hockey League first-round draft picks
Oklahoma City Blazers (1965–1977) players
Sportspeople from Fredericton
Port Huron Flags (IHL) players
Port Huron Wings players
Syracuse Eagles players
Virginia Wings players
Canadian expatriate ice hockey players in the United States